The Dehradun Shatabdi Express is an Express train of Shatabdi class belonging to Indian Railways that runs between  and  in India. It runs 7 days in a week. It operates as train number 12017 from New Delhi to Dehradun and as train number 12018 in the reverse direction. Dehradun Shatabdi Express is part of series of Shatabdi Express trains called as 'superfast train' in India. These passenger trains operated by Indian Railways to connect Metro cities with other important cities of India.

Coaches
The Dehradun Shatabdi generally has 2 AC Executive Chair Car Coaches, 12 AC Chair Car coaches, 2 luggage cum generator coaches. The train runs with the LHB coach. The number of coaches is changed as per the demand on the train. There is no pantry car but catering is arranged on board.

Service 
It is among the fastest train on the Delhi–Dehradun section along with the 12205/06 Nanda Devi AC Express & 12055/56 Dehradun Jan Shatabdi Express. It covers the distance of 315 kilometres in 6 hours 10 mins as 12017 Shatabdi Express (50.91 km/hr) & 5 hours 50 mins as 12018 Shatabdi Express (53.82 km/hr) .

Schedule 
The schedule of this 12017/12018 MGR Chennai Central - Mysuru Shatabdi Express is given below:-

Loco link
It is hauled end to end by a WAP-5 and WAP-7 engine from the Ghaziabad shed.

Routing

Gallery

References 

Shatabdi Express trains
Trains from Dehradun
Rail transport in Delhi